The Isle of Palms Connector Bridge connects the town of Mount Pleasant with the Isle of Palms in South Carolina.  The bridge is part of, and comprises most of the length of, South Carolina Highway 517, which is commonly known as the "Isle of Palms Connector", and bears the official name of "Clyde Moultrie Dangerfield Highway".  It connects US 17 in Mount Pleasant, SC with South Carolina Highway 703 on the Isle of Palms.  It was designed by a joint venture between LPA and Grenier and built by Massman Construction Company.

The connector is the site of the annual "Isle of Palms Connector Run and Walk for the Child," a combined 10k run and 5k run/walk.

The highway was named for Clyde Moultrie Dangerfield, a Charleston area business man who served in the South Carolina House of Representatives.

References
 Isle of Palms Connector Bridge. 
 Isle of Palms Connector Run and Walk for the Child. 
 1995-1996 Bill 5107. 
 National Bridge Index. 

Bridges completed in 1993
Road bridges in South Carolina
Buildings and structures in Charleston County, South Carolina
Transportation in Charleston County, South Carolina
Girder bridges in the United States